The Chernigov Regiment (also known as Chernihiv Regiment or the Regiment of Chernigov) was one of ten territorial-administrative subdivisions of the Registered Zaporozhian Host, later incorporated as an autonomy in Tsardom of Russia. In 1781, the regiment was officially abolished, and territory was reformed into the Government of Chernigov, Russian Empire.  

The Chernihiv Regiment was founded in 1648 during the Khmelnytsky Uprising. Following the signing of the Treaty of Zboriv in 1649 it consisted of 7 sotnias, and had 997 registered cossacks. After Treaty of Pereyaslav very much parts of regiment was included to Nizhyn Regiment. With 1659 in regiment started creation new sotnias. After reformation Chernihiv Regiment in 1782 consisted of 16 sotnias: Bereznynska, Bilouska, Chernihiv regimental, Horodnyanska, Kyselivska, Lyubetska, Menska, Ponurnynska, Royiska, Sednivska, Slabynska, Sosnytska, Stolynska, Synyavska, Volynska, Vybelska,    

According to documents of 1764, the regiment consisted of 9,838 land cossacks, and 19,810 helper cossacks.

Colonels 
Martyn Nebaba (Мартин Небаба) (1649–1651)

Stepan Podobailo (Степан Пободайло) (1651–1653)

Ivan Wybelskyi (Іван Вибельський) (1653–1657, 1661)

Onykii Sylych (Оникій Силич) (1657–1663)

Demian Mnohohrishnyi (Дем'ян Многогрішний) (1665–1669)

Ivan Lysenko (Іван Лисенко) (1669–1671)

Vasyl Mnohohrishnyi (Василь Многогрішний) (1671–1672)

Vasyl Dunin-Borkowskyi (Василь Дунін-Борковський) (1672–1685)

Ivan Samoylovych (Іван Самойлович) (1685–1687)

Iakiv Lyzohub (Яків Лизогуб) (1687–1698)

Iukhym Lyzohub (Юхим Лизогуб) (1698–1704)

Pavlo Polubotok (Павло Полуботок) (1706–1722)

In the XVIII century the position of colonel of the Chernihiv regiment was held by the protégés of the imperial government:

Myhailo Bohdanov (Михайло Богданов) (1723–1735)

Volodymyr Izmailov (Володимир Ізмайлов) (1736–1749)

Ivan Bozhych (Іван Божич) (1749–1762), belonged to a noble Serbian family Božić.

Petro Myloradovych (Петро Милорадович) (1762–1782), belonged to a noble Serbian family Miloradović.

References

Notes
 Encyclopedia of Ukraine 
 Zaruba V.M. Administratyvno-terytorialnyj ustrij ta administraciya Vijska Zaporozkoho u 1648-1782 rr., Dnipropetrovsk, 2007

Cossack Hetmanate Regiments
History of Chernihiv Oblast
1649 establishments in the Polish–Lithuanian Commonwealth
Military units and formations established in 1649